Baraeus taeniolatus is a species of beetle in the family Cerambycidae. It was described by Chevrolat in 1857. It is known from the Ivory Coast, the Democratic Republic of the Congo, Sierra Leone, the Central African Republic, Nigeria, and Togo.

References

Pteropliini
Beetles described in 1857